Alford Givance (born 24 March 1974) is a Jamaican cricketer. He played in one List A and two first-class matches for the Jamaican cricket team in 1992/93.

See also
 List of Jamaican representative cricketers

References

External links
 

1974 births
Living people
Jamaican cricketers
Jamaica cricketers